The East Sussex County Council election, 2009 took place on 4 June 2009 as part of the 2009 United Kingdom local elections, having been delayed from 7 May, to coincide with elections to the European Parliament. All 49 seats of this council were up for election. The councillors were elected from 44 electoral divisions, which accordingly return one or two by first-past-the-post voting, for a four-year term of office.

All locally registered electors (British, Irish, Commonwealth and European Union citizens) who were aged 18 or over on Thursday 4 June 2009 were entitled to vote in the local elections. Those who were temporarily away from their ordinary address (for example, away working, on holiday, in student accommodation or in hospital) were also entitled to vote in the local elections, although those who had moved abroad and registered as overseas electors cannot vote in the local elections. It is possible to register to vote at more than one address (such as a university student who had a term-time address and lives at home during holidays) at the discretion of the local Electoral Register Office, but it remains an offence to vote more than once in the same local government election.

Overall Results

|}

References

2009
2009 English local elections
2000s in East Sussex